Yang Fung (born 9 November 1968) is a Hong Kong sailor. He competed in the Laser event at the 1996 Summer Olympics.

References

External links
 

1968 births
Living people
Hong Kong male sailors (sport)
Olympic sailors of Hong Kong
Sailors at the 1996 Summer Olympics – Laser
Place of birth missing (living people)
Sailors at the 1994 Asian Games
Asian Games competitors for Hong Kong